Alan Ray Hacker  (30 September 1938 – 16 April 2012) was an English clarinettist, conductor, and music professor.

Biography
He was born in Dorking, Surrey in 1938, the son of Kenneth and Sybil Hacker. After attending Dulwich College (from 1950 to 1955, under Stanley Wilson until the end of 1953), he went on to study at the Royal Academy of Music where he won the Dove Prize and the Boise Travelling Scholarship which he used to study in Paris, Bayreuth and Vienna.

In 1958 he joined the London Philharmonic Orchestra. He became a professor of the Royal Academy of Music in 1960 and went on to found the Pierrot Players in 1965 along with American pianist Stephen Pruslin and Harrison Birtwistle.  In 1966, a thrombosis on his spinal column caused permanent paraplegia.  For the rest of his life he used a wheelchair and drove adapted cars.  In 1972, the Pierrot Players renamed themselves the Fires of London, and Hacker continued to perform with them until 1976.  In 1971, he founded his own group, Matrix. He was also appointed chairman of the Institute of Contemporary Arts Music section and of the British section of the International Society for Contemporary Music. He was one of those credited with reviving the basset clarinet, and in 1967, he restored the original text of Mozart's Concerto and Quintet. He played them on an instrument modelled on that for which Mozart originally wrote them, the Stadler's extended basset clarinet.

Hacker also founded the Music Party in 1972, an organisation set up for the authentic performance of classical music. The later establishment of the Classical Orchestra in York was also a vehicle which promoted the performances of the classics on original instruments.  Hacker also branched out into conducting opera, where he led performances of works from Monteverdi's Ulisse to Birtwistle's The Io Passion.

In the 1972–1973 academic year he became the Sir Robert Mayer lecturer at Leeds University. In 1976 he was appointed lecturer in music at the University of York and went on to hold a post of senior lecturer between 1984 and 1987.

Hacker was awarded the OBE for his services to music in 1988.  In 1994, he was a guest on Desert Island Discs.

Personal life
Hacker was married three times.  In 1959, he married Anna Maria Sroka, with whom he had two daughters, Katy and Sophie.  His second marriage, to Karen Wynne Evans in 1976, produced a son, Alcuin. His third wife, Margaret Lee, survives him, as do his children and first two wives.

Publications
Scores of Mozart Concerto and Quintet – 1972
1st ed. of reconstructed Mozart Concerto – 1973

See also 
 List of clarinetists

References

External links
 Alan Hacker, Desert Island Discs, 17 April 1994

Officers of the Order of the British Empire
1938 births
British classical clarinetists
People educated at Dulwich College
Fellows of the Royal Academy of Music
2012 deaths
Academics of the Royal Academy of Music
Academics of the University of York
20th-century classical musicians